On 7 April 2021, the House of Representatives of the Netherlands voted to elect its Speaker for the 2021–2025 term. The election was held three weeks after the 2021 general election. Incumbent Speaker Khadija Arib of the Labour Party (PvdA) ran for re-election, but lost to Vera Bergkamp of Democrats 66 (D66) who won the election by a margin of 36 votes.

Candidates 
Three members of the House of Representatives declared their candidacy:
 Khadija Arib (incumbent), member for the Labour Party (PvdA) since 2007
 Vera Bergkamp, member for Democrats 66 (D66) since 2012
 Martin Bosma, member for the Party for Freedom (PVV) since 2006

Results 
A total of 144 votes were cast, of which 139 were valid. 70 votes were needed for a majority.

References

2021 elections in the Netherlands
+